The TCU Horned Frogs football statistical leaders are individual statistical leaders of the TCU Horned Frogs football program in various categories, including passing, rushing, receiving, total offense, defensive stats, and kicking. Within those areas, the lists identify single-game, single-season, and career leaders. The Horned Frogs represent Texas Christian University in the NCAA Division I FBS Big 12 Conference.

Although TCU began competing in intercollegiate football in 1896, the school's official record book does not generally include records from the 1930s and before, as records from before this year are often incomplete and inconsistent. These lists are dominated by more recent players for several reasons:
 Since the 1930s, seasons have increased from 10 games to 11 and then 12 games in length.
 The NCAA didn't allow freshmen to play varsity football until 1972 (with the exception of the World War II years), allowing players to have four-year careers.
 Bowl games only began counting toward single-season and career statistics in 2002. Since then, the Horned Frogs have played in at least one bowl game in 14 seasons, and played two bowl games in the 2022 season, having played in the 2023 College Football Playoff National Championship. This has provided players in these seasons at least one additional game to accumulate statistics.
 The Big 12 has held a championship game at two different times—1996–2010 and 2017–present. The Horned Frogs played in the 2017 and 2022 editions, giving players in those seasons yet another game to accumulate statistics.
 Due to COVID-19 issues, the NCAA ruled that the 2020 season would not count against any football player's athletic eligibility, giving all who played in that season the opportunity for five years of eligibility instead of the normal four.
 All of TCU's 10 highest seasons ranked by total offensive yards have come during the 21st century. The Horned Frogs obliterated its school record in 2014, accumulating 6,929 yards of total offense after switching to an air raid offense. The Horned Frogs broke this record in 2015 by putting up 7,317 yards.

These lists are updated through the 2022 season.

Passing

Passing yards

Passing touchdowns

Rushing

Rushing yards

Rushing touchdowns

Receiving

Receptions

Receiving yards

Receiving touchdowns

Total offense
Total offense is the sum of passing and rushing statistics. It does not include receiving or returns.

Total offense yards

Touchdowns responsible for
"Touchdowns responsible for" is the official NCAA term for combined passing and rushing touchdowns.

Defense

Interceptions

Tackles

Sacks

Kicking

Field goals made

Field goal percentage

References

TCU